This is a list of Canadian archives associations, i.e., professional associations in Canada that are relevant to the work of archives and archivists.

Included are provincial and territorial associations, national special-interest groups, and history/oral-history/built-heritage associations that are specific to a Canadian location.

Canadian archives associations

See also 

 List of archives
 List of genealogical societies in Canada
 List of archives in Canada

References 

 
Archives associations
Archives_associations